Wu Li, SJ; ca. 1632-1718 was a Chinese landscape painter, poet, calligrapher and Jesuit from Jiangsu who lived during the Qing Dynasty (1644–1912).

Wu was born in Changzhou in the Jiangsu province of China. His style name was 'Yu Shan' and his sobriquet was 'Mojing Daoren'. Wu learned poetry from Qian Qianyi. He was taught painting by Wang Shimin and Wang Jian, and was influenced by the painters Huang Gongwang and Wang Meng. His landscapes utilized dry brush strokes and light colors. His distinctive style elevated him to where he is now identified as one of the Six Masters of the early Qing period.

Wu converted to Catholicism, and became a member of the Society of Jesus.  In 1688, after seven years of training at St. Paul's College, Macau, he was ordained one of the three first Chinese Jesuit priests, taking the name Simon-Xavier a Cunha. He spent the remaining 30 years of his life serving tirelessly as priest in rural villages.

The dramatic decline and fall of the Ming Dynasty and the coming to power of the Manchu Qing Dynasty caused the crisis of a number of intellectuals, who looked for new directions for them and for the country. The teaching of the Jesuits' learned missionaries, based out of Macau, appealed to them. Several literati, steeped in Confucianism and Buddhism, sought widening religious horizons, accepting the 'Western Teaching'. Conversion to Christianity was for them the arrival point of a spiritual and personal journey toward religious fulfillment. The converts saw in the Christian teaching an opportunity to revitalize, morally and scientifically, a country in crisis.

Wu often went to the Xing Fu Buddhist convent in Suzhou during his middle-age years and was a close friend of monk Mo Yong, but from 1675 on he was inclined toward Catholicism through his contact with Jesuit missionaries Lu Rima (Franciscus de Rougemont), Bai Yingli (Phillippe Couplet), and others. He was converted and christened (by?) Ximan Sawulue (Simon Xaverius). In 1681 Couplet was recalled to Europe. Wu intended to go with him, but his plans did not materialize when they reached Macau. Wu remained in Macau for five months and returned to his hometown in the summer of 1682. He returned to Macau in the winter and joined the Society of Jesus.

At the age of 50, Wu Li's life took a dramatic turn. After the death of his wife and his masters, obeying to an internal quest for spiritual excellence, fascinated by the Jesuit art and architecture, and after having been a Catholic for seven years, he chose to join the Jesuits in Macau in pursue of the 'heavenly learning'. There he strenuously searched 'the Western Lantern', struggling to learn a new language (Latin) and to acquire a new religious dimension, on the lines of the 'Spiritual Exercises', as a son of Saint Ignatius of Loyola.

He was consecrated a priest on 1 Aug 1688 in Nanjing by Chinese bishop Luo Wenzao. His first pastoral assignment was in Shanghai. In 1691 he was put in charge of the religious affairs of the Jiading Catholic Church.

Wu Li indeed chose for himself a path of self-denial and total dedication to the new faith and to the new ministry. Often disguised as a peasant or fisherman, he traveled for thirty years from village to village to evangelize. Wu Li could have become a rich and famous court painter, as had his friend Wang Hui, but he chose instead the obscurity of Jiangsu countryside to serve as an itinerant missionary and pastor, struggling against tremendous difficulties and with poor results. He was a good shepherd, in imitation of Christ, totally devoted to the spiritual welfare of peasants. The poems that he kept writing as a priest illustrate exceptional qualities of his tireless dedication, his faith, his joys and the moments of frustration.

Wu Li in no way rejected his Chinese identity, as shown by the fact that his paintings maintained an autochthonous style, and he signed them with his Chinese name. The extent of Western influence in his figurative art, if any, has been discussed by scholars, with no clear consensus reached.

Scholars, however, agree on the exceptionally important value of Wu Li's personal experience. Wu Li was a man of rare qualities: a fine Chinese intellectual, a remarkable artist, a Jesuit, a missionary and a priest totally devoted to his flock.

Wu died at age 86 after serving 30 years as a priest. He composed many poems reflecting his own preaching career and religious feelings, which are collected in an anthology, San Yi Ji. His sermons from 15 Aug 1696 to 25 Dec 1697 and other religious activities were compiled by Zhao Lun, a convert in Jiading, in a book, Kou Duo (Record of Word and Deeds), the first collection of sermons by a Chinese priest.

References

 Chaves, Jonathan, Singing of the Source: Nature and God in the Poetry of the Chinese Painter Wu Li (University of Hawaii Press, 1993).
 Chen Yuan, "Wu-Yu-shan: In Commemoration of the 250th Anniversary of His Ordination to the Priesthood in the Society of Jesus," Monumenta Serica, Vol. 3 (1938).
 Chou Kang-hsieh, ed., Wu Yu-shan (Li) yen-chiu lun-chi (reprint of 11 articles on Wu Li plus three new articles) (1971).
 Lippe, A., "A Christian Chinese Painter: Wu Li (1632-1718)," Metropolitan Museum of Art Bulletin, Vol. 11 (1952).
 Tchang, M., and P. de Prunele, Le Pere Siomon a Cunha, S.J. (Ou Li Yu-chan), L'homme et l'oevre artistique (1914).
 Weststeijn, T., "‘Intoxicated, we listened to warblers and swallows chattering in the spring wind’. Art in the friendship between François de Rougemont and Wu Li," Netherlands yearbook for history of art, Vol. 70 (2021), pp. 294–309. https://doi.org/10.1163/22145966-07001013

External links
 http://www.asianews.it/news-en/Wu-Li,-painter,-poet-and-Jesuit,-in-the-Church-of-the-Early-Qing-157.html
 http://www.bdcconline.net/en/stories/w/wu-yushan.php
 http://www.thefreelibrary.com/Wu+Li+%281632-1718%29+and+the+first+Chinese+Christian+poetry.-a098904688
 http://www.metmuseum.org/collection/the-collection-online/search/49158?=&imgno=2&tabname=label
 http://riccilibrary.usfca.edu/view.aspx?catalogID=4382

Qing dynasty landscape painters
1632 births
1718 deaths
Chinese Roman Catholics
Converts to Roman Catholicism
Chinese Jesuits
Painters from Suzhou
People from Changshu
Religious artists
Converts to Roman Catholicism from Buddhism